Air Canada Alliance was a brand name under which Air Georgian operated short-haul flights on behalf of Air Canada. The Air Canada Alliance was used from 2002, until Air Canada Express was formed in 2011. Air Georgian operated a fleet of Beechcraft 1900Ds on behalf of Air Canada Alliance. Air Canada Alliance has operated 3 bases in Calgary, Toronto, and Halifax. Air Canada Alliance was designed to allow passengers connecting through one of their three base airports to fly short connecting flights to nearby airports; for example from Toronto, Ontario to Syracuse, New York.

Operators and fleet

References

Air Canada